The Gilmore Car Museum is an automobile museum located in Hickory Corners, Michigan, United States. The museum exhibits over 400 vintage and collector vehicles and motorcycles from all eras in several vintage buildings located on a 90-acre campus. The museum claims to be the largest automobile museum in North America. It is part of the MotorCities National Heritage Area.

The museum opened in 1966 exhibiting the car collection of Donald S. Gilmore, a local businessman. Today, its collection consists of over 500 vehicles, including an 1899 Locomobile Steam Car and a 1930 Rolls-Royce prop car used in the 1967 film The Gnome-Mobile. The museum also claims to have the largest display of automotive mascots and name badges in North America. The campus includes a 1941 Blue Moon Diner and a replica 1930s Shell fuel station.

Partner museums
Seven smaller, independent museums are located on the Gilmore Car Museum campus:

 Classic Car Club of America Museum
 Model A Ford Museum
 Lincoln Motor Car Heritage Museum
 Cadillac & LaSalle Club Museum & Research Center
 Pierce-Arrow Museum
 Franklin Automobile Collection
 Museum of the Horseless Carriage

The Midwest Miniatures Museum was based on the Gilmore campus until its relocation to Grand Haven in 2020.

References

External links

Official site

Automobile museums in Michigan
Museums in Barry County, Michigan
Museums established in 1966
1966 establishments in Michigan